Federation of Swiss Private Schools (SFPS) (in German: Verband Schweizer Privatschulen "VSP" ), is a Swiss association of private Schools in Switzerland. Its aim is to bring together and defend the interests of private schools throughout Switzerland.

Private schools accredited by VSP

The Federation of Swiss Private Schools counts 240 schools as members of May 2021. In total, these schools comprise over 100,000 students from more than 100 nations.

References

External links
 Swiss Federation of Private Schools Official website

Quality assurance
Schools in Switzerland